Lim Yoon-Ho (born October 20, 1989), also known as Im Yoon-Ho, is a South Korean actor. He debuted in the MBC's television series 7th Grade Civil Servant (2013) and left a strong impression on the viewers with his acting performance.

Filmography

Film

Television

References

External links 
 
 Lim Yoon-ho at Huayi Brothers 
 

1989 births
Living people
South Korean male actors
South Korean male television actors